Walter Launt Palmer (August 1, 1854 – April 16, 1932) was an American Impressionist painter. Palmer's father Erastus Dow Palmer was a prominent sculptor, and the family residence was frequented by his father's friends, notably Frederic Edwin Church. Palmer began his formal artistic training under portrait painter Charles Loring Elliott, but it was Church, the period's premier landscape artist, who later tutored the young Palmer in landscape painting.

In 1873, Palmer made one of many trips abroad in order to work with Carolus-Duran. It was at this time that he met one of Carolus-Duran's other young students, John Singer Sargent. The artist continued to take frequent and lengthy trips to Europe, and acquired a growing interest in French Impressionism as well as an enduring attraction to Venetian subjects. When Palmer returned to the United States, he spent most of his time in Albany, where artists like William and James Hart, Homer Dodge Martin, and Edward Gay also painted. Here, Palmer began painting building interiors, his first significant series of work. He also spent some time working out of New York City at the Tenth Street Studio Building.

Palmer's most notable works are winter landscape scenes, a tradition he continued from the mid-1880s to the end of his life. For these accomplishments he has been called the "painter of the American winter." Exhibitions featuring Palmer's work have included Hawthorne Fine Art's A Perfect Solitude: The Art of Walter Launt Palmer (1854–1932) (December 12, 2006 – February 10, 2007) and the Albany Institute of History & Art's Walter Launt Palmer: Painting the Moment (March 28 - August 16, 2015).

Exhibitions 
Palmer works were exhibited in group shows and solo exhibitions throughout his career. Many of his works are collectable and can be found in museums and private collections worldwide.
 Universelle Exposition, Paris, 1900
 Corcoran Gallery of Art, Washington, D.C., 1908, 1910, 1912
 Albright Art Gallery, Buffalo, 1906

Prizes 

 Second Hallgarten Prize for January, National Academy of Design, 1887.
 First Prize, Columbian World Fair, Chicago, 1893.
 Gold Medal, Philadelphia Art Club, 1894.
 Gold Medal, Boston Art Club, 1895.
 W.T. Evans Prize, American Watercolor Society, 1895.
 Silver Medal, Pan-American Exposition, Buffalo, 1901.
 Silver Medal, St. Louis Exposition.
 Silver Medal, Philadelphia Art Club, 1907.
 Bronze Medal, St. Louis Exposition. 
 Butler Prize, Art Institute of Chicago, 1919.
 Elected into the National Academy of Design, 1887.

Gallery

References

External links
Artwork by Walter Launt Palmer

1854 births
1932 deaths
20th-century American painters
19th-century American painters
19th-century American male artists
American male painters
Artists from Albany, New York
Orientalist painters
World's Columbian Exposition
20th-century American male artists